Cycas sundaica is a species of cycad endemic to the Lesser Sunda Islands of Indonesia. It is found on the islands of Sumbawa, Komodo, Rinca, Flores, and Alor.

References

sundaica
Plants described in 2009